Schizoplacidae is a family of chitons belonging to the order Chitonida.

Genera:
 Schizoplax Dall, 1878

References

Chitons